The following lists events that happened during 1913 in Australia.

Incumbents

Monarch – George V
Governor-General – Thomas Denman, 3rd Baron Denman
Prime Minister – Andrew Fisher (until 24 June), then Joseph Cook
Chief Justice – Samuel Griffith

State premiers
Premier of New South Wales – James McGowen (until 29 June), then William Holman
Premier of Queensland – Digby Denham
Premier of South Australia – Archibald Peake
Premier of Tasmania – Albert Solomon
Premier of Victoria – William Watt (until 9 December), then George Elmslie
Premier of Western Australia – John Scaddan

State governors
Governor of New South Wales – Frederic Thesiger, 3rd Baron Chelmsford (until 11 March), then Gerald Strickland (from 14 March)
Governor of Queensland – William MacGregor
Governor of South Australia – Day Bosanquet
Governor of Tasmania – Harry Barron (until 10 March), then William Ellison-Macartney (from 4 June)
Governor of Victoria – John Fuller
Governor of Western Australia – Gerald Strickland (until 4 March), then Harry Barron (from 17 March)

Events
2 January — Australian philately proper begins in early 1913 with the Kangaroo and Map series of stamps, featuring a kangaroo standing on a map of Australia, and inscribed "AUSTRALIA POSTAGE".
 12 March — Canberra is named by Gertrude Denman
1 May — The first national banknotes were introduced in denominations of 10 shillings, and 1, 5, and 10 pounds.
31 May — 1913 Australian referendum contained six questions: Trade and Commerce, Corporations, Industrial Matters, Trusts, Monopolies, Railway Disputes.  None of these were carried.
21 June — HMAS Australia, commissioned at Portsmouth and sailed to Australia to become the Australian flagship.
 Royal Commission appointed to inquire into certain charges against Henry Chinn; Chinn was supervising engineer for the transcontinental railway in Western Australia.
 Royal Commission on Northern Territory railways and ports
 Royal Commission on powellised timber
 Golden Fleece Company established by HC Sleigh; acquired by Caltex in 1981
 The Workers' Educational Association founded; it is Australia's largest non-government adult community education organisation.
 From 1859 until 1913, a squadron of the Royal Navy was maintained in Australian waters.
Norfolk Island Act 1913 meant that Norfolk Island became an Australia Territory under the authority of the Australian Commonwealth.

Science and technology
Amalgamation took place between Marconi's Wireless Telegraph Co. Ltd and the Australian Wireless Company forming Amalgamated Wireless Australasia Limited.
The first totalisator, an entirely mechanical system invented by the Australian George Julius of Julius Poole & Gibson Pty Ltd, was installed at Ellerslie Racecourse in New Zealand.

Arts and literature

Film
Moondyne
Australia Calls, Raymond Longford's last film for Cozens Spencer was released.
 Frank Hurley's actuality film, The Home of the Blizzard, about the Douglas Mawson expedition to Antarctica, was released.

Sport
 The 1913 VFL (now AFL) Premiership was won by Fitzroy 
 The 1913 NSWRFL Premiership is won by Eastern Suburbs for the third year in a row.
 Posinatus wins the Melbourne Cup
 South Australia wins the 1912–13 Sheffield Shield
 The Australian cricket team toured USA and Canada in June to August, playing five matches, four in Philadelphia and one in Toronto.

Births

 24 January – Ray Stehr, rugby league footballer (d. 1983)
 11 February – Clyde Cameron, Whitlam government minister (d. 2008)
 20 February – Dame Mary Durack, author and historian (d. 1994)
 5 March – Darby Munro, jockey (d. 1966)
 19 March – Smoky Dawson, country music performer (d. 2008)
 3 April – William Refshauge, soldier and public health administrator (d. 2009)
 4 April – Dave Brown, rugby league footballer (d. 1974)
 20 June – David McNicol, public servant and diplomat (d. 2001)
 2 August – Nancy Phelan, writer (d. 2008)
 14 August – Hector Crawford,  Australian television producer (d. 1991)
 6 September – Ken Kennedy, speed skater and ice hockey player (d. 1985)
 2 October – Dame Roma Mitchell, 31st Governor of South Australia (d. 2000)
 30 October – Edgar Britt, jockey (d. 2017)
 30 December – Elyne Mitchell, author (d. 2002)

Deaths 

 3 January – Garnet Walch, writer, journalist and publisher (b. 1843)
 4 February – James Styles, Victorian politician (born in the United Kingdom) (b. 1841)
 18 February – George Lewis Becke, trader and writer (b. 1855)
 4 June – Ambrose Dyson, illustrator and political cartoonist (b. 1876)
 6 July – J. C. Williamson, actor (born in the United States and died in France) (b. 1844)
 20 July – Joseph Vardon, South Australian politician and printer (b. 1843)
 3 August – Sir William Lyne, 13th Premier of New South Wales (b. 1844)
 25 August – William Knox, Victorian politician and businessman (died in the United Kingdom) (b. 1850)
 12 November – Sir John George Davies, Tasmanian politician, newspaper proprietor and cricketer (b. 1846)
 25 November – Charlie Frazer – Western Australian politician (b. 1880)

See also
 List of Australian films of the 1910s

References

 
Australia
Years of the 20th century in Australia